Smooth Big Cat is the fourth studio album by Angus Stone; second under the name Dope Lemon and was released on 12 July 2019. The album peaked at number 2 in Australia.

The model pictured on the album cover is Franziska Gurtler.

Reception
Rochelle Bevis from Beat Magazine called it "Dope Lemon's most developed and ethereal sound yet" saying "This enchanting album makes you feel like you're floating after the best road trip of your life."

Taylor Marshall from The Music AU said "This is an album that will have people picking up acoustic guitars for the foreseeable future. It's layered yet simplistic, creating a relaxing vibrancy.

Ben Niesen from Atwood Magazine said "Despite repeating themes and instruments, Smooth Big Cat is like a lava lamp: kitschy and passé, but tantalising and hypnotic."

Track listing

Charts

References

2019 albums
Angus Stone albums